O class or Class O may refer to:

Locomotives
 Highland Railway O Class, a British class of 2-4-0, later 4-4-0T, steam locomotives built in the late 1870s
 NER Class O, a British 0-4-4T steam locomotive class
 NZR O class, a locomotive class of New Zealand steam engines built in the United States
 Russian locomotive class O, an early type of Russian steam locomotive
 SER O class, a British 0-6-0 steam locomotive class
 WAGR O class, Australian 2-8-0 steam locomotive class built in the late 19th century

Stars
 Class O stars, the rarest of all main sequence stars

Vessels
 , the first ships built under the United Kingdom's War Emergency Programme destroyers
 , a class of warships planned for the German Navy just prior to the Second World War

 O-class submarine (disambiguation)
 Class O, several early submarine classes of the Royal Netherlands Navy
 
 
 United States O-class submarine